Zero Tolerance is a Swedish action film which was released to cinemas in Sweden on 29 October 1999, directed by Anders Nilsson. It is the first film in the series about police officer Johan Falk (Jakob Eklund) and is followed by Executive Protection in 2001 and The Third Wave and 2003.

Plot 
Johan Falk, a Gothenburg police officer and former member of Nationella insatsstyrkan, gets involved in a shooting on Christmas Eve. He saves the life of a little girl but is then drawn into a stream of events and he ends up being the accused. In the search for the truth he sees no other way than to take the law into his own hands, and becomes hunted by his own colleagues.

Cast (selection) 
Jakob Eklund - Johan Falk
Peter Andersson - Leo Gaut
Lennart Hjulström -  Ola Sellberg
Sonny Johnson -  Thorsen
Marie Richardson - Helen Andersson
Fredrik Dolk - Peter Kroon

References

External links

1999 films
Swedish action films
1990s action films
Films set in Gothenburg
Swedish Christmas films
1990s Christmas films
1990s Swedish-language films
1990s Swedish films